Sutinder Singh Noor (5 October 1940 –  9 February 2011) was an eminent Punjabi poet and critic. 
He won the Sahitya Akademi Award in 2004 for his book of criticism, Kavita di Bhoomika. He is better known for his criticism. A former head of the Department of Punjabi, Delhi University, and editor of Punjabi Akademi journal Samdarshi, Noor was well known in Punjab's literary circles.

Works
ADHUNIK PUNJABI KAV SIDHANTAK PARIPEKH 
BIRKH NIPATTRE 
GURU GOBIND SINGH DA SANCHAR SABHYACHAR 
ITIHAS DA GAURAV: M. RANJIT SINGH 
KAVITA DI JALAVATNI 
NAIK KHASAM HAMARE 
PARHDIAN LIKHDIAN 
SABHIACHAR TE SAHIT 
SAMVAD SIRJANA

References

External links
Writer in Spotlight : Sutinder Singh Noor

Recipients of the Sahitya Akademi Award in Punjabi
Punjabi-language poets
Academic staff of Delhi University
1940 births
2011 deaths
20th-century Indian poets
Indian male poets
Poets from Punjab, India
20th-century Indian male writers